Gaurav Yadav (born April 1969) is an IPS officer of 1992 batch of Punjab cadre, who is currently serving as the DGP of Punjab.

Personal Life
Gaurav Yadav was born on 22 April 1969 in Belapar village of Jaunpur district of Uttar Pradesh, his father Colonel(rtd.) Bhagwati Prasad Yadav has been an officer of the Indian Army.

References

1969 births
Living people
Indian police chiefs
Punjab Police (India)